Geoffrey Enthoven (born 6 May 1974) is a Belgian film director, screenwriter and film editor. After graduating from the Royal Academy of Fine Arts in Ghent in 1999, he achieved several nominations and awards during his career.

His first full-length film Children of Love was greeted with enthusiasm and not only won the Audience Award at the Flanders International Film Festival Ghent but also received the Special Mention at the International Film Festival Mannheim-Heidelberg. His second film, The Only One, was named best Belgian film of 2006 by the Belgian Film Critics Association, winning the André Cavens Award.

His fifth film is Come as You Are (2011).
His latest film is Halfway (2014).

Filmography
 Children of Love (Les enfants de l'amour) (2002)
 The Only One (Vidange perdue) (2006)
 Happy Together (2008)
 The Over the Hill Band (Meisjes) (2009)
 Come as You Are (Hasta la Vista!) (2011)
 Halfway (Halfweg) (2014)

References

External links
 

1974 births
Living people
Belgian film directors
Belgian screenwriters
Belgian film editors
People from Wilrijk